The Alfred A. Schiller House was an historic residence in Glen Ellyn, Illinois. It was originally designed by Schweikher & Elting for Alfred Schiller, a professor at the University of Illinois at Chicago. The house featured very few exterior windows, with the only natural light coming in from a central atrium. The house was added to the National Register of Historic Places in 2008, and was demolished in 2016.

History
Alfred A. Schiller was professor of physiology at the University of Illinois College of Medicine. His wife, Elizabeth Schiller, was an artist from Wilmette. The Schillers commissioned the architectural firm of Schweikher & Elting to build a contemporary house in the otherwise traditional Chicago suburb of Glen Ellyn. Paul Schweikher was a notable local architect, and the house was among his last works before moving to Pittsburgh, Pennsylvania. Schweikher had previously designed the Donald Berg House in Glen Ellyn in 1947. After moving to Pittsburgh, Schweikher began to primarily design public buildings and strayed away from residential properties. Thus, the Schiller house represented one of his last ventures in this regard. The house was completed in 1954, but Alfred Schiller died only a year later. Elizabeth Schiller then married Charles Wegener, a professor at the University of Chicago, and moved to the Hyde Park neighborhood of Chicago.

The house was sold to Louis and Louisa Kaberon in 1957. Five years later, the Kaberons decided to put an addition on the house and contacted Paul Schweikher about designing it. Schweikher instead recommended the firm of Keck & Keck for the job, which was completed in 1964. It was added to the National Register of Historic Places on September 3, 2008.  After a history of being listed and delisted for sale between 2008 and 2015, the house was sold for the final time on December 16, 2015, and was demolished in 2016.  The lot has been cleared and landscaped, and now serves as an extended back yard for a neighboring property.

Architecturally, the Schiller house was notable for its lack of windows. The house formed a square doughnut shape due to a central exterior atrium. Most interior floors were terrazzo and interior walls featured African mahogany, possibly a gift from Elizabeth's father. Walls facing the atrium provided the only natural light with large, floor-to-ceiling plate glass windows. The gardens and courtyard were designed by Mary Moulton, a future librarian at the Morton Arboretum.

References
National Register of Historic Places Registration Form: Alfred A. Schiller House

Glen Ellyn, Illinois
Houses on the National Register of Historic Places in Illinois
National Register of Historic Places in DuPage County, Illinois
Houses completed in 1954
Houses in DuPage County, Illinois
Demolished buildings and structures in Illinois
Buildings and structures demolished in 2016